Gene Schroeder (born March 3, 1929) is a retired American football wide receiver in the National Football League who played six years for the Chicago Bears.  Schroeder played college football at the University of Virginia, and was a first round pick in the 1951 NFL Draft. Schroeder moved to Crown Point, Indiana in 1975, where he retired.

References

1929 births
Living people
American football wide receivers
Virginia Cavaliers football players
Chicago Bears players
Western Conference Pro Bowl players
Players of American football from Washington, D.C.